British House of Commons may refer to:
 House of Commons of Great Britain 1707–1800
 House of Commons of the United Kingdom since 1801

See also 
 House of Commons of England to 1707